James Cooper may refer to:

Arts and entertainment
James Fenimore Cooper (1789–1851), American writer
James Cooper (artist) (fl. 1940), African-American cane carving artisan
James Cooper (producer), British podcaster

Politics
James Cooper (Pennsylvania politician) (1810–1863), American soldier and politician
James Cooper (Northern Ireland politician) (1882–1949), MP in the Northern Ireland Parliament for Fermanagh and Tyrone
James Cooper (Ontario politician) (1900–1979), Canadian politician

Others
James Fairlie Cooper (1814–1869), American soldier and minter
James Graham Cooper (1830–1902), American surgeon and naturalist
James Cooper (VC) (1840–1889), British soldier
James Cooper (minister) (1846–1922), Church of Scotland minister and church historian
James Scott Cooper (1874–1931), Canadian businessman and noted bootlegger
James Cooper (shoe merchant), 19th-century Canadian shoe merchant who built James Cooper House
James Cooper (pitcher) (born 1919), American baseball player
James Cooper (coach) (born 1982), American college baseball coach

See also
Jim Cooper (disambiguation)
Jimmy Cooper (disambiguation)
James Couper (disambiguation)